A Wonderful Christmas with Ashanti is a holiday EP by American R&B recording artist Ashanti. Originally released to iTunes on December 3, 2013 as a five-song EP, the collection featured recordings from the Lifetime original movie Christmas In The City. On October 27, 2014, it was re-issued as a full-length album in the form of a Deluxe Edition to digital retailers with three newly recorded songs. Furthermore, the album was given a physical release exclusively to Target stores in the U.S. on the same date, with an additional two exclusive songs. In a 2014 interview with Arise Entertainment 360, Ashanti revealed that her parents, sister and cousin provided backing vocals for her rendition of "White Christmas", which was recorded for the expanded 2014 re-issue of the album.

Track listing

References

2014 Christmas albums
Christmas albums by American artists
Contemporary R&B Christmas albums
Ashanti (singer) albums